Crespano del Grappa is a small town and a frazione of Pieve del Grappa in the province of Treviso, Veneto region of Italy. As of 2007 Crespano del Grappa had an estimated population of 4,680.

History

Crespano del Grappa was a separate comune (municipality) until 30 January 2019, when it was merged with Paderno del Grappa to form a new comune.

Twin towns
Crespano del Grappa was twinned with:
 Griffith, Australia
 Folsom, United States

References

Cities and towns in Veneto